Marcelo Javier Cabrera Rivera (born 18 March 1992) is a Uruguayan footballer who plays for Argentinos Juniors as a right winger.

Club career
Born in Florida, Cabrera graduated from Montevideo Wanderers F.C.'s youth setup. On 11 April 2010 he played his first match as a professional, coming on as a late substitute in a 1–1 away draw against Liverpool F.C. for the Uruguayan Primera División championship.

Cabrera scored his first professional goal on 2 October 2010, in a 2–0 away win against Racing Club de Montevideo. He appeared regularly for the club in the following three campaigns, but with his side only achieving mid-table positions.

On 21 July 2014 Cabrera signed a one-year loan deal with Recreativo de Huelva, in Spanish Segunda División. He made his debut for the club on 31 August, starting in a 0–0 away draw against Deportivo Alavés.

On 9 July 2019, Cabrera was signed on a 2-year deal by Australian A-League club Melbourne City.

References

External links
ESPN Deportes profile 

1992 births
Living people
Uruguayan footballers
Uruguayan expatriate footballers
People from Florida Department
Association football wingers
Montevideo Wanderers F.C. players
Melbourne City FC players
Recreativo de Huelva players
Argentinos Juniors footballers
Unión de Santa Fe footballers
Deportivo Toluca F.C. players
Liga MX players
Primera Nacional players
Segunda División players
Uruguayan Primera División players
Argentine Primera División players
Uruguayan expatriate sportspeople in Spain
Uruguayan expatriate sportspeople in Argentina
Uruguayan expatriate sportspeople in Mexico
Uruguayan expatriate sportspeople in Australia
Expatriate footballers in Spain
Expatriate footballers in Argentina
Expatriate footballers in Mexico
Expatriate soccer players in Australia